Sage Alexandra Hurta-Klecker (née Hurta) (born 23 June 1998) is an American middle-distance runner competing primarily in the 800 metres and the 1500 metres.

Hurta-Klecker is a member of On Athletics Club, coached by former professional runner Dathan Ritzenhein, and is based in Boulder, Colorado.

Early life 
Hurta was born in Buffalo, New York to parents Gary and Amy Hurta of Hamilton, New York. Hurta was brought up in Hamilton, attending Hamilton Central school from kindergarten to 12th grade where she competed on a national level. Both her parents attended Cornell University where Amy Hurta competed for the cross country and track teams and Gary was also represented the track team. She has previously stated that her parents were responsible for her initial interest in running.Hurta placed 2nd in 800 meters final in 2:06.37 at the 2016 New Balance Nationals Outdoor, 2nd in mile in 4:47.75 at 2016 New Balance Indoor Nationals, 3rd in mile in 4:56.17 at 2015 New Balance Indoor Nationals, 3rd in mile in 4:56.50  at the 2014 New Balance Nationals Outdoor, and Sage Hurta won 800 meters in 2:12.78 at 2012 New Balance Nationals Outdoor.

Collegiate career 
She competed collegiately for the University of Colorado, Boulder where she became an indoor NCAA mile champion. She also became just the second woman in the history of the university to achieve NCAA Division 1 All-America status in the mile.

Personal bests 
Outdoor

 400 metres — 54.84 (Boulder, CO 2021)
 800 metres — 1:57.85 (Monaco 2022)
 1500 metres — 4:01.79 (Memphis, TN 2022)
 One mile — 4:26.76 (Raleigh, NC 2021)

Indoor

 800 metres — 2:02.54 (Fayetteville, AR 2021)
 1500 metres — 4:06.43 (New York, NY 2022)
 One mile — 4:25.45 (New York, NY 2022)

National championships

References

External links
 Sage Hurta - Life As A Pro Runner for OAC, University of Colorado Experience, & NY Running Culture Convos Over Cold Brew with Emma Abrahamson (August 2022)
 Ali on the Run Show Episode 589. Sage Hurta, Professional Runner for On Athletics Club - November 24, 2022 Ali on the Run Show
 
 Sage Hurta University of Colorado track and field profile
 Sage Hurta University of Colorado cross country profile

1998 births
American female middle-distance runners
American female long-distance runners
Track and field athletes from Colorado
Living people
American middle-distance runners
University of Colorado alumni
Colorado Buffaloes women's track and field athletes
Sportspeople from Buffalo, New York
Sportspeople from New York (state)
21st-century American women